The Mahindra Scorpio Getaway is a pickup truck manufactured by the Indian automaker Mahindra & Mahindra. It is essentially the pickup truck variant of the Mahindra Scorpio SUV and was launched in April 2006.

As of October 2019, in addition to India, the Scorpio Getaway is also sold in Australia, New Zealand, South Africa, Chile, Italy, Nepal and Indonesia along with other African and Latin American countries. It competes with the Tata Xenon in India, as well with the global competitors like the Toyota Hilux, Isuzu D-Max, Mitsubishi Triton, Ford Ranger, Fiat Fullback and Foton Tunland.

Overview 

In India, the Scorpio Getaway is only available in a 4-door double cab, however, in some selected markets, a 2-door single cab is also offered, along with the double cab model. It is available in 2WD or 4WD configurations with low range.

Safety features of the vehicle includes crash protecting crumple zones, child lock, collapsible steering and side intrusion beams. Additional features includes tubeless tires, voice assist system, touchscreen infotainment system with Bluetooth and navigation, and remote lock/unlock system. 

The Scorpio Getaway has an approach angle of 34 degrees, a departure angle of 15 degrees and a breakover angle of 18 degrees. It features a mechanical locking differential, manufactured by the world renowned Eaton Corporation, which provides ‘shift-on-the-fly’ on the rear axle to help with off-roading.

In South Africa, it was launched there in April 2006 as the Mahindra Scorpio Pik-Up initially with SZ CRDe 2.6L engine and later it used the same 2.2-litre engine but has a compression ratio of 16.5:1 and delivers to  @3750rpm and  @1500-2800rpm. The facelifted model was later launched in October 2017, thus renaming it simply as the Mahindra Pik-Up.

In Australia, the Mahindra Scorpio Getaway was launched as the Mahindra Pik-Up in April 2009, with sales began starting from the western continent in November 2009. It was powered by a 2.5-litre CRDe diesel engine, delivering 79kW and 247Nm. Starting in 2011 the engine was changed to the 2.2-litre mHawk diesel with a compression ration of 18.5:1, delivering  @4000rpm and  @1800rpm. The Pik-Up was also launched in New Zealand in 2014.

The Scorpio Getaway was launched in Indonesia on 17 October 2019, marketed as the Mahindra Scorpio Pik-Up. It is available there either a single cab or a double cab and powered by the same 2.2-litre mHawk diesel engine.

Specification

ENGINE 

Gearbox

5 Speed Manual
6 Speed Manual (Pik-Up)

Tyre

P 245 / 75 R16, RADIAL Tubeless 
 
SUSPENSION

Front - Double wish-bone with torsion bar

Rear  - Semi-elliptical leaf spring with double acting hydraulic shock absorber and stab bar 
 
BRAKES

Front - Disc

Rear  - Drum 
 
FUEL TANK - 
 
MAX.GVW -  for 2WD,  for 4WD

References

Scorpio Getaway
Pickup trucks
Cars introduced in 2007